Sanjiv N. Sahai (IAS) is a former Secretary to the Government of India in the Ministry of Power from 1 November until 31 January 2021.

Early life
Sanjiv Sahai was born in Bhagalpur, Bihar. He spent his childhood in Jamshedpur, where he attended Loyola School. He moved to Delhi for his university education and studied history (Honours) from Hindu College, Delhi. He has a master's degree in public policy from Princeton University, where he focused on economic policy.

He has been a Robert McNamara fellow  at Princeton University, USA  and a recipient of Joint Japan World Bank Fellowship.

Career
Sanjiv Sahai started his career with Tata Administrative Service and then went on to join the Indian Administrative Service (IAS) in 1986. Over the years he has served on a number of positions, including five years in the Indian Prime Minister's Office where he was closely associated, amongst others, with development of road and transport infrastructure. In 2004, he was also the Chairman and MD of Delhi Transport Corporation, while serving as the Secretary-cum-Commissioner Transport for Delhi Government. Later in 2005, "he was appointed as the Chairman of the Chandigarh Housing Board by the Union Ministry of Home Affairs."

In 2007 he was nominated by IDFC to "head DIMTS"  as its MD & CEO. Delhi Integrated Multi-Modal Transit System Limited (DIMTS) is an urban transport and infrastructure development company with equal equity from the Government of National Capital Territory of Delhi (GNCTD) and the IDFC Foundation (a not-for-profit initiative of Infrastructure Development Finance Company Limited).

In 2015, Sahai was posted as Finance Secretary in the Government of NCT of Delhi where he was instrumental in formulation of a detailed outcome budget as part of the restructuring governance. He led the team on formulation of budget which had the highest allocation for social sectors such as Education and Health and he played a crucial role in the ushering in of the GST in Delhi. He was also concurrently the Home Secretary which was marked by stand off between the AAP Government and the Lieutenant Governor of Delhi over Delhi Police, Prosecution etc.

In May 2018, Sahai was posted as the Additional Secretary to the Government of India in the Ministry of Power.

On 1 November 2019, Sahai assumed charge as Secretary to the Government of India in the Ministry of Power.

Director of NMML 
Post his retirement as Secretary, Sahai was appointed as the Director of the Nehru Memorial Museum and Library.

Social interests
Sanjiv Sahai has also been closely associated with cause of promoting public transport in the city. He has published several papers on the subject of public transport and sustainable development of cities and is also a frequent speaker at both national and international symposiums. Under his guidance, the company has brought a mobile app that allows bus users to find out what time their bus will arrive at a bus stop. Called the Delhi Transit Bus Info app, it provides public with real-time data on the buses and thus seeks to make bus travel a more reliable experience. Another mobile app, Tell Tail has been developed as a security app that lets individuals reach out to their friends and family in emergency situations on the press of a button.

Awards
 Governor's gold medal for outstanding service in Arunachal Pradesh
 Asia Pacific HRM Congress Awards’ CEO with HR Orientation Award 2013 by Institute of Public Enterprises (IPE)

References

External links
http://www.cseindia.org/userfiles/sanjiv_nsahai.pdf
 Interview: Improving Integrated Traffic Infrastructure with IT by TrafficInfraTech Magazine
 It’s rapid transit for majority: Experts
 New mobile application for women’s safety

Living people
1961 births
Indian business executives
Businesspeople from Bihar
Princeton University alumni